Tsentraly may refer, less commonly, to airports in Riga, Moscow, Saratov, or Orenburg.

Tsentralny Airport is an airport in Omsk Oblast, Russia, located 5 km southwest of Omsk. It is capable of handling wide-bodied aircraft and 975,000 passengers passed through the airport in 2013.

Airlines and destinations

Accidents and incidents

On 11 October 1984, a Tupolev Tu-154B-1 operating as Aeroflot Flight 3352 crashed into maintenance vehicles occupying the runway at Omsk. 174 of the 179 people on board were killed, along with 4 of the maintenance crew. The ground controller on duty had allowed maintenance work to be done on the runway (against regulations) and promptly fallen asleep, while the pilots were unable to see the vehicles in time due to poor weather conditions. 178 people died in all, making this the Soviet Union's deadliest airplane crash until that date.
2001 Antonov An-70 Crash
After Russian government critic Alexei Navalny fell ill on 20 August 2020 after being allegedly poisoned at the Tomsk airport before his flight to Moscow, the plane was diverted to Omsk.

References

External links
Omsk Tsentralny Airport official website 

Airports built in the Soviet Union
Airports in Omsk Oblast